Noofar Parsa (born April 16, 1990) is an Iranian actress.

Career
Parsa began her career with a few brief episodes in the TV series Would probably happen to you too.

Filmography

Tv Series
2013 Would probably happen to you too episode There was no heart failure
2014 Sounds of Rain
2014 Would probably happen to you too episode Among collectors
2014 Would probably happen to you too episode Level
2014 Last Sultan
2017 The best lead in life 
2017 Borna
2022 Unmarked

Film
2014 Impost
2015 Shadows of rana
2016 Se harfi hasht amoodi 
2017 Man o sharmin
2019 One Night in Tehran

References

External links

Living people
Iranian stage actresses
Actresses from Tehran
1990 births
21st-century Iranian actresses